"Hold on Me" is the debut single by British pop group Phixx, released on 27 October 2003 in the United Kingdom. The single debuted and peaked at number 10 on the UK Singles Chart.

Track listings
UK CD1
 "Hold on Me" (radio edit) – 4:04
 "Hold on Me" (EuropaXL Vocal Mixx) – 6:30
 "Creepin"
 "Hold on Me" (video)

UK CD2
 "Hold on Me" (radio edit) – 4:04
 "Eyes Wide Open"
 "Hold on Me" (Happy Rocker extended mix)

Charts

References

2003 songs
2003 debut singles
Concept Music singles
Phixx songs